Unni Evjen (August 3, 1943 – September 27, 2019) was a Norwegian actress.

Evjen received her education at the National Academy of Theatre and made her debut at the Oslo New Theater in 1965 in Anne-Catharina Vestly's children's comedy Ut av trolldommen. She had a breakthrough at the Norwegian Theater in 1968 as Hedvig in The Wild Duck. From 1970 to 1974, she was one of NRK Television Theatre's most prominent young performers. From 1974 to 2010 she was employed at the Oslo New Theater, where she had several major roles.

Evjen was also engaged with the Norwegian National Traveling Theater, where among other performances she played the title role in the stage adaptation of Knut Hamsun's Victoria. She also appeared in many television productions, among which she played Rosa in Benoni og Rosa.

Filmography

 1968: De ukjentes marked
 1968: Hennes meget kongelige høyhet as Julie, Georg's girlfriend
 1968: Smuglere as Klara
 1971: Herr Print oppdager seg selv (1971) as Janine
 1971: Mooney og campingvognene (TV) as Mave
 1971: Samfunnets støtter (TV) as Dina Dorf
 1971: Smilet (TV) as Her
 1972: En folkefiende (TV) as Petra
 1972: Fru Warrens virksomhet (TV) as Vivie Warren
 1972: Yerma (TV) as Maria 
 1973: Aksel og Marit (TV) as Anne, a waitress
 1973: Kirsebærhaven (TV) as Dunjasja
 1973: Benoni og Rosa (TV) as Rosa
 1975: Bydelen som ikke vil dø (TV)
 1975: Svigerdottera (TV) as Minnie
 1979: Lucie as Mrs. Mørk
 1981: Martin as Kjersti Horn
 1985: Du kan da ikke bare gå as Johan's mother
 1989: Maria er så liten (TV) as Inger
 2014: Fargene Forsvant (short) as Ingeborg

References

External links
 
 Unni Evjen at Sceneweb
 Unni Evjen at Filmfront

1943 births
2019 deaths
20th-century Norwegian actresses
21st-century Norwegian actresses
People from Sør-Varanger